The following events occurred in August 1965:

August 1, 1965 (Sunday)
Jim Clark of Scotland clinched the 1965 Formula One racing championship by winning the German Grand Prix at Adenau, outside of Nürburgring.  It was Clark's sixth victory in all six of his starts in the 1965 season.
Cigarette advertising became illegal on British television.  Still, the number of British cigarette smokers continued to increase until the mid-1970s.
General Lo Jui-ching, the Chief of Joint Staff of the armed forces of the People's Republic of China, declared on Radio Peking that the Chinese were ready to fight the United States again, as they had in the Korean War.  Comparing U.S. President Lyndon Johnson to Adolf Hitler, Benito Mussolini and Hideki Tojo, General Lo said of the Americans that "If they lose all sense of reality in their lust for gain and persist in underestimating the strength and determination of the Chinese people, impose a war on us, and compel us to accept the challenge, the Chinese people and the Chinese People's Liberation Army, long well prepared and standing in battle array, not only will stay with you without fail to the end, but invite you to come in large numbers, the more the better.
Born: Sam Mendes, English film director who won an Academy Award for American Beauty and a Golden Globe for Road to Perdition; in Reading, Berkshire

August 2, 1965 (Monday)
The Meiku Maru weighed 995 tons, and the Arizona, whose crew of 57 was unhurt, weighed more than 12 times as much at 12,711 tons.
Britain's new Leader of the Opposition, Ted Heath, moved to censure the government of Prime Minister Harold Wilson.  The motion, a vote of confidence on Wilson's government, failed, 290-303.
Born: 
Sandra Ng, Chinese film and television actress, as Ng Kwan-yu in Hong Kong
Hisanobu Watanabe, Japanese baseball pitcher and manager, in Kiryū
Died: František Langer, 77, Czech dramatist, physician, screenwriter, and literary critic

August 3, 1965 (Tuesday)
After coming under attack by Viet Cong sniper fire, U.S. Marines burned down the South Vietnamese village of Cam Ne, "using flame throwers, cigarette lighters and bulldozers" to set fire to 150 houses made up of straw, thatch, and bamboo, and bulldozing homes made of sturdier materials. Major General Lewis W. Walt, the commander of the 3rd Marine Division, said in a statement that "the civilians had been urged in advance by helicopter loudspeakers to go to open fields where they would be safe" before their homes were burned down.  The Marines were accompanied by CBS reporter Morley Safer and a cameraman, and while the newspaper reports of the deliberate destruction of homes had little impact, American TV viewers were shocked when they saw film of the attack on the CBS Evening News, and U.S. President Lyndon Johnson was infuriated by the CBS decision to show the Vietnam War in an unfavorable light.
Rex Heflin, a highway inspector working in the area of Santa Ana, California, photographed a UFO.  His four Polaroid photos, distinguishable from previous purported pictures of such objects,  would come to be considered among the most reliable evidence of the existence of UFOs because the photographs in a Polaroid 101 camera developed inside the camera within one minute after being taken.  Earlier in the week, police in central Oklahoma and southwestern New Mexico received multiple calls from witnesses who had seen "objects flying very high and changing from red to white to blue-green, in diamond-shaped formations" in Chickasha, Shawnee, Cushing, and Chandler, Oklahoma; and Hobbs, New Mexico, Carlsbad, New Mexico, and Artesia, New Mexico.

August 4, 1965 (Wednesday)
The Cook Islands officially became self-governing, with Albert Henry as their first prime minister.
The U.S. Senate voted, 79 to 18, to pass the Voting Rights Act of 1965. The day before, the measure had passed the U.S. House of Representatives, 328 to 74, and, hours later, passed the U.S. Senate.
McDonnell Aircraft Corporation delivered Gemini spacecraft No. 6 to Cape Kennedy. Industrial area activities during the next three weeks included pyrotechnics buildup and spacecraft modifications. The spacecraft was moved to Merritt Island Launch Area for Plan X integrated tests with the Agena target vehicle during the last week of August.
Born:
Dennis Lehane, American mystery novelist, in Boston
Fredrik Reinfeldt, Prime Minister of Sweden from 2006 to 2014, in Stockholm

August 5, 1965 (Thursday)
The Indo-Pakistani War of 1965, also referred to as the "Second Kashmir War", began as Pakistan commenced Operation Gibraltar when as many as 10,000 armed infiltrators crossed into India and the state of Jammu and Kashmir, disguised as civilians. India and Pakistan had fought over the area after both became independent in 1947, and had divided the area along a ceasefire line on January 1, 1949, with Pakistan organizing the area west of the line as Azad Kashmir. Sixty companies of the Pakistani armed services came across the line with instructions for targets to attack, and several were captured that day. Within the first three weeks of fighting, 412 Pakistani servicemen and 150 Indian soldiers would be killed in combat. The war would last five months, until January 4, 1966, when the two nations agreed to withdraw their troops back to their respective sides of the 1949 line.
Only 21 days after becoming Prime Minister of Greece, the unpopular Georgios Athanasiadis-Novas was voted out of office by a vote of 167 to 131 in the Hellenic Parliament. King Constantine II had appointed Athanasiadis-Novas on July 15 after dismissing his predecessor, Georgios Papandreou. Papandreou demanded and received a face-to-face meeting with the King and told reporters later that he had asked the king to reappoint him as the Premier, or to call new elections.
Sir Gerald Lathbury succeeded Sir Alfred Dudley Ward as Governor of Gibraltar.
After reviewing the photographs of Mars transmitted by the Mariner 4 space probe, NASA's chief reviewer, Dr. Robert B. Leighton, announced that there was no life on Mars, and it was unlikely that there ever had been. "There never has been an ocean on Mars," Dr. Leighton said in a press conference, "which makes it less hopeful that life could have started there spontaneously."
Future U.S. President Gerald R. Ford, a Congressman from Michigan and the leader of the Republican minority in the House of Representatives, urged President Johnson to ask Congress to declare war on North Vietnam, so that the increasing commitment of American servicemen could be debated. "It would be the honest thing to do under the circumstances, considering our present commitment."
Atlas standard launch vehicle 5302 was shipped from San Diego by truck, arriving at Cape Kennedy August 11. The vehicle had come off the production line and been delivered to the Gemini program on April 2. Final assembly had been completed May 25, installation of flight equipment and Gemini-peculiar kit June 3, and factory testing July 22. Air Force Space Systems Division had formally accepted the vehicle on July 29.
Fifteen members of a film crew were injured in an accident during the filming of the movie Easy Come, Easy Go, including the lead actor, Jan Berry of the rock duo Jan and Dean, and the director, Barry Shear. Background scenes were being filmed aboard a flatcar at a railroad yard in the Chatsworth section of northwestern Los Angeles, when a train crashed into the car from behind. Berry (who would be injured in a car wreck in April 1966) sustained a compound fracture of his left leg, while Shear suffered internal injuries. Paramount Pictures would abandon the project and recycle the title two years later for an unrelated story starring rock singer Elvis Presley.

August 6, 1965 (Friday)
The Soviet Union's Zond 2 space probe passed within  of the planet Mars, closer than the American Mariner 4 approach on July 15. Unfortunately, the Zond probe had stopped transmitting on May 2, so none of the images it had taken were received on Earth.
On the 20th anniversary of the atomic bombing of Hiroshima, a crowd of 30,000 people gathered at the Peace Memorial Park, where Mayor Shinzo Hamai added 469 additional names to the list of identified victims of the blast, including 69 who had died in the past year from radiation-related cancers. The other 400 people had been killed when the bomb detonated on August 6, 1945, and remained unidentified for more than 19 years.
Retaliating for an attack on one of its patrol craft in April by gunboats from the People's Republic of China, the Navy of Taiwan sent two of its ships, the Jianmen and the smaller Zhangjiang, across the Taiwan Strait to stage a landing on the coastline of Guangdong province near Shantou. The People's Liberation Army Navy dispatched four of its own gunboats and after a three-hour battle, both of the Taiwanese ships were sunk.
After its pilots bailed out safely following gunfire, a B-57 bomber and its payload of 16 armed  bombs crashed in a residential area of the South Vietnamese city of Nha Trang, killing at least 12 people and injuring 75 others.
Peter Watkins's The War Game, a British television drama-documentary depicting the aftermath of a nuclear attack on the UK, was pulled from its planned transmission as BBC1's The Wednesday Play for political reasons. It would go on to win the 1966 Academy Award for Best Documentary Feature.
President Lyndon Johnson signed the Voting Rights Act of 1965 into law after speaking in the rotunda of the United States Capitol. Johnson then went over to the Senate Chamber for the first time since becoming President, reportedly "used about 100 pens" to sign the document, and announced that the first lawsuits under the new Act would be filed the next afternoon at 1:00. The law, initially set to expire after five years, eliminated literacy tests and other provisions that had been used to disqualify African-Americans from voting, and would dramatically increase the number of registered black American voters. By 1969, 60 percent of eligible blacks in southern states would be registered to vote; in Mississippi, the number of black voters would increase eight-fold between 1964 (7%) and 1968 (59%).
Between August 6 and 10, NASA Associate Administrator for Manned Space Flight George E. Mueller advised the Center Directors at Manned Spacecraft Center (MSC), Marshall Space Flight Center (MSFC), and Kennedy Space Center (KSC) of the establishment within the Office of Manned Space Flight of the Saturn/Apollo Applications (SAA) Office, which would have responsibility for both the Saturn IB Centaur program and the Apollo Extension System (AES) effort. David M. Jones, Deputy Assistant Administrator for Manned Space Flight (Programs), assumed the additional duties of SAA Acting Director. John H. Disher, formerly Test Director in the Apollo Program Office, was named Deputy Director. Mueller sent Center Directors planning guidelines for proceeding with the definition phase of the AES program, including schedules, missions, organizational responsibilities, payload integration, and experiment definition and development. (These guidelines envisioned a buildup to four AES missions per year during 1970 and 1971.) Mueller also requested that each human spaceflight center prepare a plan for implementing the AES program definition phase based on these guidelines and including planned procurements, facility modifications, staffing requirements, and an assessment of the definition program's impact on the Apollo program.
Born:
Chin Ka-lok, Chinese action movie actor and TV host; in Hong Kong
David Robinson, U.S. Navy officer and NBA all-star, inductee in the Basketball Hall of Fame; in Key West, Florida
Mark Speight, English children's TV host; in Seisdon, Staffordshire (d. 2008, suicide by hanging)
Died:
Nancy Carroll, 61, American stage and film actress. Ms. Carroll was found dead in her apartment after failing to show up for the final performance of the play Never Too Late at the Tappan Zee playhouse in Nyack, New York, where she  co-starred with Bert Lahr.
Everett Sloane, 55, American character actor on radio, stage, film, and television, was found dead in his home after taking an overdose of barbiturates, apparently in despair over his failing eyesight.

August 7, 1965 (Saturday)
The Singapore Agreement was signed by Tunku Abdul Rahman, the Prime Minister of Malaysia, and Lee Kuan Yew, who had continued to lead Singapore since its merger with Malaya and other nations to create the Federation of Malaysia. The parties agreed that "Singapore shall cease to be a State of Malaysia on the 9th day of August 1965... and shall become an independent and sovereign State separate from and independent of Malaysia."
A planned concert by The Beatles in Vienna, Austria, was canceled by the organizers, the Jeunesses Musicale, which had sponsored the concerts in hopes of earning enough money to sponsor classical music programs. The event had been set for October 24, 25 and 26, but few tickets had been sold less than four months before showtime and the media showed no interest.
The two men had set out two days earlier from Lavrentiya in Siberia, where both worked at a smelter, on a mushroom hunting trip. After getting lost in a fog, they found that they had reached the United States, and asked for political asylum. Both would eventually change their minds and ask to return to the U.S.S.R., with Sarapushkin leaving on November 30, and Kalitenko departing on September 19, 1966, after briefly working in Detroit.

August 8, 1965 (Sunday)
Refusing to restore Giorgios Papandreou as the Premier of Greece, King Constantine instead appointed Papandreou's deputy premier, Stefanos Stefanopoulos and asked him to form a new government.
Three days after Pakistan began Operation Gibraltar, four men who had been the first four Pakistani volunteers to be captured on India's side of Kashmir ceasefire line were interviewed on All India Radio and publicly described Pakistan's secret plan for infiltration.
NBC Sports made its first telecast under its five-year national television contract that had ensured the survival of the American Football League in its competition with the National Football League.  The opening event was a preseason game between the Buffalo Bills and the Boston Patriots, which Buffalo won, 23-0.  Since the NFL had not started its preseason, CBS Sports countered the NBC broadcast by showing the Baltimore Colts' "Blue-White Game", the annual scrimmage between two squads of the Colts team. 
Died: Shirley Jackson, 48, American author best known for her controversial 1948 story "The Lottery", died of heart failure in her home in Vermont

August 9, 1965 (Monday)

By a vote of 126 to 0, the Parliament of the Federation of Malaysia passed the Singapore Amendment Act to the Malaysian Constitution, expelling Singapore from the union that had existed since 1963. Soon afterward, Lee Kuan Yew, who had been governing Singapore since 1959 under British, and then Malaysian authority, announced that Singapore was declaring its sovereignty as a separate nation. As the new Prime Minister of an independent Singapore, he held a press conference and "was overcome by his emotions when narrating the sequence of events leading to Singapore's proclamation of independence earlier that morning", crying in front of a national television audience. "Depending on which history book you read," an author would note later, "Singapore separated of its own accord from Malaysia... or it was evicted."
A U.S. Air Force crew closed the hatches to prevent the Titan II missile inside from exploding, smothering the fire but sealing the workers inside. The men were all civilians working for Peter Kiewit and Sons Construction Company, and were working to remodel the silo's physical plant; the missile's warhead had been removed before work had started.
On orders from U.S. Attorney General Nicholas Katzenbach, the United States Civil Service Commission dispatched federal examiners to register African-Americans in nine counties where few had been allowed to vote. The order came three days after the Voting Rights Act was signed into law. The counties affected were the parishes of East Carroll, East Feliciana, and Plaquemines in Louisiana; Leflore and Madison County in Mississippi; and four counties in Alabama (Dallas, Hale, Lowndes, and Marengo). Over 1,000 new voters were registered on the first day.

August 10, 1965 (Tuesday)

Representatives of the Kingdom of Jordan and the Kingdom of Saudi Arabia signed a border agreement in Amman, with the Saudis receiving  of Jordanian territory, and Jordan getting  of Saudi land along the Gulf of Aqaba and the Red Sea. The exchange of territories fixed an anomaly in the border that had been called "Winston's Hiccup", in that Winston Churchill had drawn the boundaries while serving as the British Colonial Secretary in 1921 and, according to an apocryphal story, he had been inebriated at the time.
Israeli inventor Simcha Blass and his son established the Netafim Irrigation Company to revolutionize the irrigation process in the deserts of Palestine.
President Johnson signed the Housing and Urban Development Act of 1965 into law. In signing the bill, Johnson commented, "Education matters a great deal. Health matters. Jobs matter. Equality of opportunity and individual dignity matter very much. But legislation and labors in all of these fields can never succeed unless and until every family has the shelter and the security, the integrity and the independence, and the dignity and the decency of a proper home."
Born:
Claudia Christian (Claudia Ann Coghlan), American TV actress best known for Babylon 5; in Glendale, California
Mike E. Smith, American jockey, Racing Hall of Fame inductee, winner of multiple Breeders' Cup races, as well as the 2005 Kentucky Derby, the 1993 Preakness and the 2010 and 2013 Belmont Stakes; in Roswell, New Mexico

August 11, 1965 (Wednesday)

At 7:00 in the evening in the mostly African-American section of Watts in Los Angeles, a white California Highway Patrol officer, Lee W. Minikus, was riding his motorcycle along 122nd Street, and was flagged down by a passing black motorist, who told of seeing a car being driven recklessly.  Minikus located the 1955 Buick, and it pulled over at the corner of 116th Street and Avalon Boulevard, where the black driver, Marquette Frye, was asked to step out and take a sobriety test on suspicion of drunken driving.  The other man in the car, Frye's brother Ronald, ran home and brought the men's mother, Rena Price, to the scene.  When Frye failed the test, Minikus notified him that he was under arrest and by 7:15, Minikus's CHP partner, a patrol car, and a tow truck arrived.  By that time, the crowd of curious spectators had grown from about 25 people to several hundred.  According to an investigative report, Marquette's mother began scolding him for drinking and "Marquette, who until then had been peaceful and cooperative, pushed her away and moved into the crowd, cursing and shouting at the officers that they would have to kill him to take him to jail."    As the tension increased, the three family members and the three officers were scuffling, more highway patrolmen arrived and Los Angeles Police Department officers were called in, and the Watts Riots began.  By the time that the rioting ended six days later, 34 people had been killed, 1,032 had been injured, and 3,952 arrested, and there was more than $40,000,000 of damage.
Twenty-nine people were killed, and 11 others seriously injured, after a bus traveling between Istanbul and Ankara collided with a stalled tanker truck that was carrying nitric acid.  Both vehicles had rolled off of the road and into a ditch, where a pool of the truck's deadly liquid cargo had accumulated.  Most of the casualties were bus passengers who had survived the crash, but then escaped from the bus and plunged into the ditch.  Twenty-three died at the scene, and six others (including the truck driver) died of their burn injuries after reaching the hospital.
Abe Fortas was confirmed as the newest justice of the U.S. Supreme Court by a voice vote in the Senate, despite protests by Republican senators that he was "a security risk", "totally lacking in judicial temperament", and unqualified beyond being a personal friend of the President.
Born: Viola Davis, American stage, film, and TV actress, winner of the Tony Award in 2010 for her role in Fences; in St. Matthews, South Carolina
Died: Bill Woodfull, 67, Australian cricketer

August 12, 1965 (Thursday)
Lieutenant (j.g.) Donald H. Brown Jr. of the USS Coral Sea was killed in the crash, becoming the first U.S. Navy flier to be downed by a SAM missile.
A Paraense Curtiss C-46A-50-CU Commando, registration PP-BTH, en route to Cuiabá, caught fire and crashed in Buracão, close to Barra do Bugre, in the State of Mato Grosso, Brazil. All 13 passengers and crew were killed.
McDonnell finished systems assurance testing of Gemini spacecraft No. 7. Validation of the environmental control system concluded August 19, and preparations were started for the Simulated Flight Test which began August 26.
Gemini Program Office informed the NASA-McDonnell Management Panel of the decision to fly the new, lightweight G5C space suit on Gemini VII. Tested by Crew Systems Division, the suit displayed a major improvement in comfort and normal mobility without sacrificing basic pressure integrity or crew safety. Under study was the possibility of allowing one or both astronauts to remove their suits during the mission. NASA Headquarters, on July 2, had directed that the flight crew not use full pressure suits during the Gemini VII mission.

August 13, 1965 (Friday)
Elizabeth Lane became the first woman to be appointed as a judge on Great Britain's High Court of Justice.
Max Scherr, a 49-year-old political activist in Berkeley, California, published the first issue of the Berkeley Barb, the original "underground newspaper".
The rock group Jefferson Airplane made its first appearance on the opening night of the Matrix nightclub in San Francisco, co-owned by band member Marty Balin.
Died: Hayato Ikeda, 65, Prime Minister of Japan from 1960 to 1964, from cancer of the larynx

August 14, 1965 (Saturday)
The Indian Army clashed with the Army of Pakistan in response to the invasion of the Indian side of the disputed Kashmir territory, after crossing into the Pakistani side near Tithwal.  Using a barrage of artillery against Pakistani positions in the northern mountains, they seized strategic positions in the mountains to the north.
After a boycott of the South Korean National Assembly by the opposing parties, 110 of the 111 members from the Democratic Republican Party, voted in favor of ratification of the controversial peace treaty between South Korea and Japan. The other member of the DRP, which held the overwhelming majority of the 175 seats in the Assembly, abstained.
The third season of the Bundesliga, West Germany's premier football league, began.  It marked the first season for FC Bayern Munich, which would win 16 league championships in 51 seasons.

August 15, 1965 (Sunday)
The Beatles performed the first stadium concert in the history of rock, playing before 55,600 people at Shea Stadium in New York City. An author would note later, "It was to be the first of a large number" of concerts played at sports stadiums, "as both promoters and musicians discovered that huge sums of money could be made literally overnight."  The total ticket sales added up to $304,000 of which the Beatles received $160,000.  After paying $30,000 to rent the stadium, $14,000 to the city of 130 police to be present, $11,000 for insurance, and other expenses, promoter Sid Bernstein made a profit of $7,000.  Their 1965 North American tour would take them to outdoor stadiums in Atlanta, Chicago, Minneapolis, and San Diego, as well as to arenas at Toronto, Houston, Portland, Los Angeles, and San Francisco. 
Dave Marr won the 1965 PGA Championship golf tournament, played at the Laurel Valley Golf Club in Ligonier, Pennsylvania.
Two American high school students broke existing world records in swimming competition at the National AAU Swimming and Diving U.S. national championships at Maumee, Ohio.  Kendis Moore, a 16-year-old from Phoenix, set a new mark for the women's 200 meter butterfly, at 2 minutes, 26.3 seconds.  Steve Krause, a 16 year old from Seattle, swam the 1,500 meter freestyle in 16 minutes, 58.6 seconds, becoming the second person to swim the "metric mile" in less than 17 minutes.
Jo Siffert won the 1965 Mediterranean Grand Prix, held in Italy at the Autodromo di Pergusa, Sicily.
The Cathedral of Our Lady Assumed into Heaven and St Nicholas, Galway, Ireland, designed by John J. Robinson, was dedicated.
Born: 
Vincent Kok, Chinese actor, director, and scriptwriter; in Hong Kong
Mark Labbett, English game show host; in Tiverton, Devon

August 16, 1965 (Monday)
The Soviet Union released the first photographs ever taken of the northern hemisphere of the far side of the Moon, sent back to Earth by the Zond 3 space probe after it had flown within  of Earth's satellite.
In his first speech as U.S. ambassador to the United Nations, Arthur J. Goldberg announced that the United States would no longer seek enforcement against the U.S.S.R. and France of Article 19 of the UN Charter, which provides that member nations would lose their votes if they were more than two years delinquent in their payments to the international organization. "Until that statement," International Court of Justice President Stephen M. Schwebel would write later, "the United States, together with the United Kingdom, had led a majority of the membership of the Organization in a determined effort to uphold the financial authority of the United Nations."
Martin-Baltimore received propellant tanks for Gemini launch vehicle (GLV) 9 from Martin-Denver, which had begun fabricating them February 25. These were the first GLV tanks to be carried by rail from Denver to Baltimore. All previous tanks had traveled by air, but shortage of suitable aircraft made the change necessary. The tanks were shipped August 9. Aerojet-General delivered the stage I engine for GLV-9 August 20 and the stage II engine September 22. Tank splicing was completed October 21, engine installation November 10. Horizontal testing concluded November 23.
Heavyweight boxer Joe Frazier, a gold medalist in the 1964 Summer Olympics, had his first professional bout, defeating Woody Goss in the first round of a fight in Philadelphia. He would win his first 25 fights, capturing the vacant world heavyweight championship in 1970, and defending it against Muhammad Ali in 1971, before losing to George Foreman in 1973.
Instead of leveling off, however, the jet continued its descent at an estimated rate of 9,430 feet per minute (more than 150 feet per second or ), and impacted at 9:20 p.m. local time, with such force that the flight data recorder was never located. Although the 727s had seats for 130 passengers, only 24 were on board Flight 389; they and the crew of six were all killed, including Clarence "Clancy" Sayen, a former president of the Air Line Pilots Association.

August 17, 1965 (Tuesday)
At the United Nations, the United States presented a proposed treaty to stop the proliferation of nuclear weapons, with all signing parties agreeing not to provide weapons to other nations.  The Soviet Union would present its own version on September 28.
William C. White, an African-American veteran of the Korean War and one of 21 who had defected to the People's Republic of China after being captured by North Korea, returned to the non-Communist world after more than 11 years.  White, from Plumerville, Arkansas, walked across the border into Hong Kong, along with his Chinese wife and two children.
President Sukarno of Indonesia announced what he called the "Proclamation of Indonesian Independence", a withdrawal from participation in the World Bank (the International Bank for Reconstruction and Development) and condemned the Vietnam War.  After Sukarno's loss of power in 1966, Indonesia would resume its membership on February 21, 1967.
Died: Hans Nielsen, 53, German film actor

August 18, 1965 (Wednesday)
Operation Starlite began as 5,500 United States Marines destroyed a Viet Cong stronghold on the Van Tuong peninsula in Quảng Ngãi Province, in the first major American ground battle of the war.  Three days earlier, the Marines had been alerted by a captured Viet Cong prisoner that 1,500 VC soldiers were camped nine miles away from the U.S. base at Chu Lai and preparing a massive attack. When the battle ended six days later, the Viet Cong had lost 573 confirmed dead, and 115 estimated additional killed, while 51 U.S. Marines were killed and 203 wounded.
Born: Ikue Ōtani, Japanese voice actress best known as the voice of Pikachu in the Pokémon anime series; in Kashiwazaki

August 19, 1965 (Thursday)
King Constantine II named Ilias Tsirimokos to become the new Prime Minister of Greece to succeed the government of Georgios Athanasiadis-Novas that had collapsed after only three weeks. The Tsirimokos administration would last only ten days before his government, like that of Athanasiadis, failed a vote of no confidence.
The Second Auschwitz trial came to an end in Frankfurt after 20 months, as sentences were handed down to 17 people who had aided the mass murders of inmates at the Auschwitz concentration camp during World War II. The proceedings were the longest and largest in German legal history. Six people, five of them former members of Nazi Germany's SS, were sentenced to life imprisonment. Sergeant Wilhelm Boger, the master torturer of the camp, had been convicted of "personally committing 114 murders and aiding many more". Sergeant Oswald Kaduk had been identified by trial witnesses as "The Butcher of Auschwitz" and had been in a Soviet prison until 1956 before being indicted for murder charges in West Germany. Medical Sergeant Josef Kiehr had admitted killing as many as 300 people by injecting carbolic acid into their hearts. Captain Franz Hofman, the Auschwitz security chief and the Commandant of its camp for Roma (gypsy) prisoners, was already serving a life sentence for murders carried out at the Dachau concentration camp. The other two were a guard, Corporal Stefan Baretski; and an inmate, Emil Bednarek, who had betrayed his fellow prisoners in order to receive privileges. West Germany had abolished the death penalty when it promulgated its first constitution in 1949. Eleven others were given prison terms ranging from three to 14 years, and three defendants were acquitted. The trial had started on December 20, 1963, and saw testimony from 358 witnesses, most of whom were survivors of the Holocaust. Fifty years later, during the trial of 93-year old Oskar Groning in 2015, it would be estimated that, "of an estimated 6,500 SS men who served in Auschwitz and survived the war, only 49 were punished" by tribunals in West Germany and East Germany.
On the same day, West German diplomat Rolf Pauls presented his credentials to Israeli President Zalman Shazar to become the first German ambassador to the State of Israel.
Two students from Penn State (Pennsylvania State University) sneaked into NASA's launch area and came within  of Launch Pad 19, where Gemini 5 was scheduled for a liftoff. The two young men, Gary Ralph Young, 22, and Theodore Lee Ballenger, 17, were spotted by a closed circuit television camera which "picked up a view of a barefooted, barechested young man relaxing in the sand". Young told arresting officers that "I didn't realize it was dangerous" and that he had come within  of the Titan rocket, and that Ballenger had stopped further away, both intending to get a very close view of the liftoff. "When we went in there and walked past the first guard," Young said, "he was too busy smoking a cigarette to see us. Is this the type of security we have for the U.S. Government?" Both were fined $100 and sentenced to six months in jail, probated for two years. The countdown for the launch was uninterrupted by their morning intrusion, but was halted at 1:08 p.m., only ten minutes before liftoff, because of problems with telemetry. While the problem was being investigated, thunderstorms approached the Cape Kennedy area. With the computer problem unresolved and the weather deteriorating rapidly, the mission was scrubbed and rescheduled for August 21. Recycling began with unloading propellants. As with all previous American crewed launches, the three American television networks had pre-empted their regular programming and commercials for the entire day.
From August 19 to 24, Lockheed conducted Agena target vehicle shroud separation tests at its Rye Canyon Research Center. Tests comprised four separations at simulated altitudes, all successful. After test data had been analyzed, the shroud was judged to be flightworthy.
Born: Kyra Sedgwick, American television actress known for portraying LAPD interrogator Brenda Leigh Johnson on The Closer; in New York City

August 20, 1965 (Friday)
Diplomat Asher Ben-Natan presented his credentials to the Bundesrat President in Bonn and became the first ambassador from Israel to Germany.
More than 200 young men training at Camp Breckinridge, a federal Job Corps center in Morganfield, Kentucky, rioted for three hours. Ten people were injured and windows at the administration building were smashed after a brawl broke out in the cafeteria. Most of the 670 students were African-American males, ranging in age from 16 to 21, who had dropped out of school and had come to the camp from large cities under a program administered by Southern Illinois University. The group was already dissatisfied with the poor quality of the food and the long waits in line.
As part of MSFC's activities related to the AES program, designers at the Center began serious investigation of the concept of an S-IVB Orbital Workshop (OWS). This concept, which involved "in-orbit" conversion of a spent S-IVB stage to a shelter suitable for extended crewed stay and utilization, showed great potential for experiment work during the Earth-orbital phase of the AES program. Accordingly, MSFC officials planned a four-month conceptual design effort, to begin immediately, with help and participation from both MSC and the S-IVB stage builder, Douglas Aircraft Company. On August 25, program planners met to initiate the OWS conceptual design study. Participants reviewed previous NASA and industry studies pertaining to rocket stage laboratory ideas (essentially those as presented to the Manned Space Flight Management Council on July 20, 1965). These studies formed the point of departure for the four-month OWS study. Those present agreed that serious consideration must be given to simplified versions of the Workshop to achieve early launch dates and to hold down program costs. A technical working group was created to oversee the conceptual design study, with J. H. Laue as chairman. Laue divided areas of responsibility among the group members and planned to hold biweekly meetings for the duration of the study.
Died: Jonathan Daniels, 26, American Episcopal seminarian from Keene, New Hampshire, was shot dead in Hayneville, Alabama, while participating in the civil rights movement.  Tom L. Coleman had been aiming a gun at a black teenager, Ruby Sales, and Daniels had pushed her out of the way and taken the bullet. Six weeks later, an all-white jury in Lowndes County acquitted Coleman of homicide charges after accepting his claim of self-defense. Coleman had testified that Daniels had threatened him with a knife, even though no weapon was ever found.

August 21, 1965 (Saturday)
The South African rugby union team were defeated 13-0 by New Zealand at Dunedin during their tour of Australasia.
The Great National Assembly adopted the 1965 Constitution of Romania, which was published in Monitorul Oficial the same day. The country would thereafter be called the Socialist Republic of Romania, and the "brotherly" alliance with the Soviet Union would be replaced with the principle of "respect for national sovereignty and independence, equality of rights and reciprocal advantage, non-interference in internal matters". 

Gemini 5 lifted off at precisely 10:00 a.m. from complex 19 at Cape Kennedy in Florida and began its first orbit six minutes later. The crew comprised command pilot Astronaut L. Gordon Cooper, Jr., and pilot Astronaut Charles Conrad, Jr. Major objectives of the eight-day mission were evaluating the performance of the rendezvous guidance and navigation system, using a rendezvous evaluation pod (REP), and evaluating the effects of prolonged exposure to the space environment on the flight crew. Secondary objectives included demonstrating controlled reentry guidance, evaluating fuel cell performance, demonstrating all phases of guidance and control system operation needed for a rendezvous mission, evaluating the capability of either pilot to maneuver the spacecraft in orbit to rendezvous, evaluating the performance of rendezvous radar, and executing 17 experiments. The mission proceeded without incident through the first two orbits and the ejection of the REP. About 36 minutes after beginning evaluation of the rendezvous guidance and navigation system, the crew noted that the pressure in the oxygen supply tank of the fuel cell system was falling. Pressure dropped from 850 pounds per square inch absolute (psia) at 26 minutes into the flight until it stabilized at 70 psia at 4 hours 22 minutes, and gradually increased through the remainder of the mission. The spacecraft was powered down and the REP exercise was abandoned. By the seventh revolution, experts on the ground had analyzed the problem and a powering-up procedure was started. During the remainder of the mission the flight plan was continuously scheduled in real time. The mission would break the record for longest crewed spaceflight, and would be the first to test fuel cells as a supply for electrical power. Gemini 5 was the 11th crewed American space mission, and the 19th for the world's nations.
The CBS Television Network announced that, effective immediately, it would reduce the amount of uninterrupted live coverage that it would give to space missions. The network's decision came after it (and its competitors, ABC and NBC) had pre-empted regular programming for seven hours on Thursday until the countdown had been halted on the Gemini 5 launch.
The Alibates Flint Quarries in Texas were designated a United States National Monument.
Died: Odile Defraye, 77, Belgian road racing cyclist

August 22, 1965 (Sunday)
In US baseball, San Francisco Giants batter Juan Marichal struck Los Angeles Dodgers catcher Johnny Roseboro repeatedly in the head after Roseboro removed his own helmet and mask during an argument.  Earlier, Marichal had thrown two "brushback" pitches near the head of Dodger leadoff batter Maury Wills.  When Marichal came up to bat against Sandy Koufax in the last of the third inning, Roseboro's throw back to Koufax grazed Marichal's ear, and the fight began. When the brawl between the teams ended after 14 minutes, Roseboro required 14 stitches to his head. At the time, the Dodgers and Giants were in first and second place in the National League pennant race, and the Giants' 4-3 win, powered by a home run from Willie Mays off of Sandy Koufax put them at 69 wins, 51 losses (.575), only 0.001 behind the 72-53 (.576) Dodgers.
Born: David Reimer, Canadian man raised as a girl after a botched circumcision and involuntary sex reassignment; in Winnipeg, Manitoba (d. 2004)

August 23, 1965 (Monday)
The International Conference on Family Planning Programs, the first worldwide meeting on the issue of controlling the "population explosion", opened in Geneva with representatives from 36 nations.
Dr. Who and the Daleks, the first theatrical film ever based on a television series, was released in the United Kingdom during the closing weeks of the school summer holiday. In order to qualify for the U-certificate for viewing by universal audiences (equivalent to the later "G" rating in the United States), the filmmakers "rather than trying to establish continuity or canonicity, transformed the principal characters and their relationships", casting Peter Cushing rather than TV's William Hartnell as a more cheerful version of The Doctor and making the story more suitable for children.
Gemini Agena target vehicle 5002 completed preliminary systems testing at Hangar E and was transferred to Merritt Island Launch Area, where it was joined by spacecraft No. 6 for Plan X testing. After ground equipment checks, Plan X tests proceeded on August 25. No significant interference problems were found, and testing ended on August 31.
Died: 
Orvil A. Anderson, 70, American pioneer balloonist, later a U.S. Air Force major general, who set an altitude record in 1935 of 
Mostafa El-Nahas, 86, Prime Minister of the Kingdom of Egypt on five occasions between 1928 and 1952

August 24, 1965 (Tuesday)
A new word, "hypertext", entered the English language at the annual conference of the Association for Computing Machinery in Pittsburgh, as Ted Nelson presented his paper, A File Structure for the Complex, The Changing and the Indeterminate, and described his vision of "a body of written or pictorial material interconnected in such a complex way that it could not conveniently be presented or represented on paper", making it possible for a global publishing system that could "grow indefinitely, gradually including more and more of the world's written knowledge", with "every feature a novelist or absent-minded professor could want, holding everything he wanted in just the complicated way he wanted it to be held, and handling notes and manuscripts in as subtle and complex ways as he wanted them to be handled."  
Fifty-eight of the 71 U.S. military personnel were killed in the crash of a C-130 Hercules cargo plane which plunged into Yau Tong Bay shortly after takeoff from Hong Kong.  Most of the passengers were U.S. Marines who had been on leave and were returning to South Vietnam
President Gamal Abdel Nasser of Egypt and King Faisal of Saudi Arabia announced that they had reached a nine-point agreement at the Saudi Arabian port of Jeddah for the gradual withdrawal of 50,000 Egyptian troops in Yemen, and free elections in that Arab nation in 1966 for voters to choose between restoring the monarchy or continuing with the republic.
In the Soviet Union, arrests began of 26 "nationally minded Ukrainian intellectuals" throughout the Ukrainian SSR in "the first major KGB operation of this sort since Stalin's death".  Following searches of homes and interrogation of suspects, authors Andrei Sinyavsky and Yuli Daniel would be put on trial in 1966 on charges of "anti-Soviet agitation and propaganda".  It was speculated that the intent was to intimidate Ukrainian dissenters and to thwart defiance against the government, but the result was public protests and a resurgence of Ukrainian nationalism.
Born: Marlee Matlin, American actress, in Morton Grove, Illinois

August 25, 1965 (Wednesday)

 In a press conference at the White House, U.S. President Lyndon B. Johnson announced that he had given the go-ahead for the United States Air Force to develop an American space station, the $1.5-million Manned Orbiting Laboratory (MOL), to be launched by 1968. Such a program, the President said, would bring "new knowledge about what man is able to do in space." Further, MOL "will enable us to relate that ability to the defense of America." The MOL was to be used primarily for military reconnaissance, and when it became clear that uncrewed satellites were more efficient at spying on the enemy, the MOL project would be canceled on June 10, 1969, after $1.4 billion had been spent. NASA would take contracts that the Air Force had had for development of the station, and would launch Skylab into orbit in 1973.
 President Johnson directed federal agencies to adopt "Planning, Programming, Budgeting Systems" (PPBS) based on the model introduced by U.S. Secretary of Defense Robert McNamara. Johnson described PPBS as a "new and revolutionary system" that would bring "the full promise of a finer life... to every American at the lowest possible cost" in advancing his Great Society initiative. The U.S. government would not abandon the approach until 1971; an observer would write in 1989 that PPBS had been "almost a total failure" and asked the question, "By the way, who is responsible for the billions of dollars and millions of man-hours wasted on this gimmick?"
 The only functioning X-19 airplane, an experimental VTOL aircraft, was destroyed in a crash at the Federal Aviation Administration's National Aviation Facilities Experimental Center near Atlantic City, New Jersey. Both pilots ejected safely, but the accident effectively ended the X-19 program.
 Twelve people were killed and 22 injured in a series of explosions at a Dupont chemical plant in Louisville, Kentucky, that had been manufacturing the rubber substitute Neoprene. The initial explosion happened at 10:25 in the morning; another blast happened at 6:30 in the evening while rescuers were looking for bodies. A compressor that circulated vinylacetylene in gaseous form overheated, causing the first blast.
 Died: Archibald "Moonlight" Graham, 85, American physician and baseball player whose major league career was limited to one inning of a major league game, without getting a turn at bat. His unusual story would later make him an important character in the popular 1989 film Field of Dreams.

August 26, 1965 (Thursday)
The Soviet Ministry of Defense issued an order directing the chiefs of the Soviet space program and the Soviet Army's missile program to collaborate on a new project, Soyuz 7K-L1, to land the first man on the Moon before the U.S. Apollo program could accomplish the task. Sergei Korolev led the OKB (Opytnoye Konstruktorskoye Buro or Experimental Construction Bureau) for the space program, OKB-1, while Vladimir Chelomei guided OKB-52 for guided missiles. Together, the two would work on a multi-stage rocket, the N1-L3, to rival the American Saturn V, combining an extra stage with the powerful Proton rocket and a "stripped down" version of the Soyuz 7K-OK.
At 8:06 a.m. Florida time, Gemini 5 astronauts Gordon Cooper and Pete Conrad broke the previous record for longest crewed spaceflight, the 119 hours and 6 minutes set by the Soviet Union's Valery Bykovsky on Vostok 5 in June 1963. Bykovsky's feat had broken Cooper's record of 34 hours set in May 1963.
John Coltrane recorded his album Sun Ship, which would eventually be released in 1971 after his death.
The city of Gold River, British Columbia was incorporated as the first creation from the Canadian province's "instant towns" program.
President Johnson signed an Executive Order removing a marriage exemption from the draft, although married fathers between the ages of 19 to 26 were still exempt. Americans who got married before midnight on the 26th would remain exempt from conscription into military service. Hundreds of men drove to Nevada in order to get married without a waiting period, and would find out four days later that they had only deferred eligibility for four months; General Lewis B. Hershey announced on August 30 that all married, childless men (aged 19 to 26) would be eligible for the draft beginning in January 1966.
Born: Marcus du Sautoy, British mathematician, in London

August 27, 1965 (Friday)
George E. Mueller, Associate Administrator for Manned Space Flight, requested MSC Director Robert R. Gilruth to identify the requirements for a spacecraft atmosphere selection and validation program to support the longer duration phase II missions of the AES program. (Mueller's request stemmed from a series of discussions and AES planning meetings between him and the Director of Advanced Manned Missions Studies, Edward Z. Gray, during June and July 1965.) Although nominal mission duration for the phase II flights was pegged at 45 days, Mueller affirmed the likelihood that, with the conduct of rendezvous missions, flight times for some crewmembers could be as long as 135 days. Accordingly, he asked that MSC evaluate the question of spacecraft atmospheres based upon mission durations of 45, 60, 90, and 135 days. Mueller requested MSC to complete the atmosphere cabin validation program expeditiously so that results could be readily incorporated into the design of the vehicle and integrated into mission planning. In his reply, Gilruth stated that studies of single, as well as two-gas, atmospheres were required. Continued research on a 34-kilonewton-per-sq-m (5-psia), 100-percent oxygen atmosphere was desirable both scientifically and operationally. Such a cabin atmosphere was very attractive because of attendant simplicity of the environmental control system. However, Gilruth said, recent data indicated possible impairment of vital body processes that necessitated additional study to validate the pure oxygen environment for flights of longer than 30 days. MSC researchers had begun investigating various combinations of two-gas atmospheres, chiefly mixtures of 50-percent oxygen and 50-percent nitrogen; 70-percent oxygen and 30-percent nitrogen; and 70-percent oxygen and 30-percent helium. MSC had underway, both in house and under contract, engineering studies of two-gas environmental control systems, and AiResearch Corporation was already developing such a system using as many existing command and service module components as possible. Houston was also working closely with the Air Force's School of Aviation Medicine during that agency's investigations of various cabin atmospheres. Finally, Gilruth stated, Houston planned to hold a Workshop conference with engineering and pulmonary physiology specialists to establish the basis for atmosphere selection and to discuss implementation of experimental programs.
The Beatles visited Elvis Presley at his home in the Bel Air neighborhood of Los Angeles, California. It would be the only time the band and the singer met. At the request of the band, no recordings or photographs of the occasion were taken for publication.
Died: Charles Le Corbusier (Charles-Édouard Jeanneret-Gris), 77, legendary Swiss-born French architect who had designed the Headquarters of the United Nations building in New York City, and the planned city of Chandigarh in India, drowned while swimming in the Mediterranean Sea at the resort of Roquebrune-Cap-Martin. Although early reports listed his death as an accidental drowning, he had been quickly rescued by other swimmers who saw him struggling; an autopsy showed that Le Corbusier had died of a heart attack.

August 28, 1965 (Saturday)
 Subway, which would become the world's largest restaurant chain, with more than 26,000 franchises in the United States and more than 44,000 in 112 nations, held the grand opening of its first submarine sandwich restaurant. Fred DeLuca, a 17-year-old college freshman, borrowed $1,000 from a family friend, nuclear physicist Peter Buck, and opened "Pete's Super Submarines" at a storefront at 3851 Main Street in Bridgeport, Connecticut, on the corner of Main Street and Jewett Avenue. DeLuca would later relate that after opening several restaurants, he realized that "When people heard the name Pete's Submarines over the radio, they often thought they heard the words 'pizza marine'" and would ask for pizza. Looking for "a name that was short, clear, and difficult to mispronounce", DeLuca settled on the shorter form for the submarine sandwich, "sub", and "changed the name to Pete's Subway, and eventually to Subway."

 Born:
 Gordon Darcy Lilo, Prime Minister of the Solomon Islands from 2011 to 2014, in Ghatere, Kolombangara island
 Satoshi Tajiri, Japanese video game designer who created the Pokémon franchise of video games, card games and phone apps; in Machida, Tokyo
 Shania Twain, Canadian country music singer and songwriter, as Eilleen Regina Edwards, in Windsor, Ontario
 Died: Giulio Racah, 56, Italian-born Israeli theoretical physicist and mathematician for whom the Racah W-coefficient and the Racah parameter are named, as well as a crater on the Moon. Professor Racah was visiting his hometown of Firenze and apparently died from carbon monoxide poisoning caused by a defective space heater.

August 29, 1965 (Sunday)
The government of Indonesia arrested the five Koeswoyo brothers, who performed their own and other bands' rock music under the band name "Koes Bros". John, Yok, Yon, Nomo, and Tonny Koeswoyo had originally emulated the Everly Brothers, and later copied the style of The Beatles, which got them in trouble on the charge of playing what President Sukarno called "ngak-ngik-ngok music" (ngakngik-ngek being Indonesian slang for "crazy mixed-up noises"). They would not be released until October.
Only ten days after he was named as Prime Minister of Greece, Ilias Tsirimokos was forced to resign after failing a vote of no confidence, 159 to 135. Tsirimokos was the third Prime Minister in six weeks of political upheaval.

Gemini V splashed down at 8:55 a.m. in the Atlantic Ocean after the longest crewed spaceflight up to that time, just 65 minutes short of eight days (7 days, 22 hours, 55 minutes) in outer space. Astronauts Gordon Cooper and Pete Conrad made 120 orbits around the Earth and reportedly traveled  in their circuits of the globe. Retrofire was initiated in the 121st revolution, one revolution early because of threatening weather in the planned recovery area. Reentry and landing were satisfactory, but the landing point was  short, the result of incorrect navigation coordinates transmitted to the spacecraft computer from the ground network. The capsule was picked up by the prime recovery ship, the aircraft carrier , in a little more than an hour.
The asteroid 2326 Tololo was discovered by the Indiana Asteroid Program at Goethe Link Observatory.

August 30, 1965 (Monday)
The French ship Arsinoe was stranded on the Scarborough Reef. It later broke in two and sank.
Eighty-eight workers were killed in an avalanche at the Allalin Glacier that buried the Mattmark Dam construction site at Saas-Fee in Switzerland. The disaster happened at about 6:00 p.m. when a huge section of the glacier broke loose from Strahlhorn mountain and traveled  in about 90 seconds to a construction camp where the men, mostly Italian, had been staying. Most of the dead were late shift workers who were asleep when  of debris had overrun their camp, while some were eating their evening meal. Reportedly, the air pressure from the approaching mass shattered the buildings before they were buried.
General Antonio Imbert Barrera announced that he and the other members of the military junta governing the Dominican Republic would resign to make way for a civilian government.
Formerly all-white schools across the southern United States opened the 1965-1966 school year with African-American students, without incident, as desegregation of public schools became nearly universal. Former sites of segregated schools, including Atlanta and Valdosta, Georgia; Mansfield, Texas, Philadelphia, Mississippi, Selma, Alabama, and Lexington, Kentucky, integrated peacefully. The impetus for integration was Title VI of the Civil Rights Act of 1964, which denied federal funding to any public school district that discriminated based on race, color, religion, sex, or national origin, and required schools to submit a plan for desegregation by August 31. A week earlier, The New York Times had reported that about 400 of the 5,000 school districts (such as Glascock County, Georgia or Amite County, Mississippi) in 17 southern and border states had elected to forego federal funding rather than desegregate, but by week's end, the number had dropped to 172.
Casey Stengel, the 75-year-old manager of the New York Mets, announced his retirement after 55 years in baseball.
Rock musician Bob Dylan released his influential album Highway 61 Revisited, featuring the song "Like a Rolling Stone".
Stage I of Gemini launch vehicle (GLV) 6 was erected at complex 19. Stage II was erected the following day. Umbilicals were connected and inspected September 1, and Subsystems Reverification Tests began September 2. These tests were completed September 15. The Prespacecraft Mate Verification Test of GLV-6 was run September 16.
The Simulated Flight Test of Gemini spacecraft No. 7 ended at McDonnell. The spacecraft was cleaned up and moved to the altitude chamber September 9. Phasing checks were conducted September 10-11, and the spacecraft was prepared for altitude chamber tests, which began September 13. Chamber tests concluded September 17. The spacecraft was deserviced, updated, retested, and prepared for shipment to Cape Kennedy.

August 31, 1965 (Tuesday)
All nine men on a U.S. military transport were missing and presumed dead after the plane disappeared while flying from Nha Trang in South Vietnam to Manila in the Philippines.
A truce was declared in the Dominican Republic between the "Constitutionalists" (supporters of the deposed Juan Bosch administration) and conservative military forces, led by army general Elías Wessin y Wessin. American peacekeeping forces began to be withdrawn shortly afterward. In the course of the war, a total of 44 American soldiers died, 27 in action, whilst an estimated 6,000 to 10,000 Dominicans, mostly civilians, were killed.
Amendments to the United Nations Charter went into effect, increasing the number of UN Security Council members from 11 to 15 (Article 23); the number of votes needed to affirm a Security Council decision changing, from 7 of 11, to 9 of 15 (Article 27); and the number of members of the UN Economic and Social Council from 18 to 27 (Article 61).
President Johnson of the United States signed a law penalizing the burning of draft cards with up to 5 years in federal prison and a $1,000 fine.
Leonard Marks became director of the United States Information Agency.
Gemini Program Office reported that during the missions of Gemini 4 and 5, skin-tracking procedures had been successfully developed. On these missions, the C-band radars were able to track the spacecraft in both the beacon and skin-track mode. It was, therfore, possible to obtain tracking data when the spacecraft was powered down and had no tracking beacons operating. As a result, the skin-tracking procedures were integrated into the network support for all remaining Gemini missions.
Died: Henri Mignet, 71, French aircraft designer

References

1965
1965-08
1965-08